Peter Keely (1922 – 15 October 2004) was an Irish footballer who played with Shelbourne and represented the league internationally.
Keely won two league titles, in 1947 and 1953, two Shields and two inter-league caps during his eleven season with Shels. Following his 1947 title, he was offered £2,000 to transfer to Leeds United, but declined. He played as a wing-halfback and was released by Shels in July 1956.

His son Dermot had two spells as Shelbourne manager.

Peter Keely was given a Hall of Fame award at the 1997 FAI Cup final alongside Fay Coyle.

Selected honours 
 League of Ireland: 2
 1946-47, 1952-53
 League of Ireland Shield: 2
 1945, 1949

References

1922 births
2004 deaths
League of Ireland players
Shelbourne F.C. players
Glentoran F.C. players
Year of birth uncertain
Association football wing halves
Republic of Ireland association footballers